Shanique Dessing (born 31 December 2000) is a Dutch footballer who plays as a forward for PSV in the Eredivisie.

Club career
Shanique began her career with ADO Den Haag in 2017 after being transferred to its main team; beforehand, she played 38 matches for their Promise team, scoring 12 goals. In 2020, she signed a contract with the team that would last until mid-2022.

International career

Personal life
Dessing was born in Delft. As of 2020, she is studying business economics at Erasmus University Rotterdam.

Honours

Club

International

References

Living people
Dutch women's footballers
Eredivisie (women) players
2000 births
Women's association football forwards
ADO Den Haag (women) players
21st-century Dutch women